Ba River (also known as Ea Pa, Ia Pa,  Krông Pa or Đà Rằng River) is a river in the South Central Coast region of Vietnam. It has its source in Kon Tum Province and flows into the South China Sea in Tuy Hòa, Phú Yên Province. 
It has the largest river valley area in central Vietnam and one of the largest river systems in central Vietnam with a total basin area of 13,900 km² or 4.19% of Vietnam's total area.
It has a total length of 374 km.

Geography
Ba River's basin area makes up southern Phú Yên Province, parts of Đắk Lắk Province, around half of Gia Lai Province and parts of Kon Tum Province and therefore, much of the eastern part of the Central Highlands. 
Tributaries include Hinh River and Ayun River, among many others.

The river's water volume varies significantly throughout the year, with only 47 and 45 m3/s in March and April and 366, 682, and 935 m3/s in September, October, and November.

History
Remains from different periods have been found along Ba River. They include a Sanskrit inscription from the fifth century at its mouth and various Champa sites, including the citadel Thanh Ho around 15 km inland. The river certainly provided an important route far into the interior for the Cham people, who were involved in trade with both their highland hinterlands and seagoing merchants.

References

Bibliography
 Vickery, Michael (2009): "A Short History of Champa". in Hardy, Andrew et al.: Champa and the Archaeology of My Son. NUS Press, Singapore

Rivers of Phú Yên province
Rivers of Vietnam